Premeaux-Prissey (also Prémeaux-Prissey) is a commune in the Côte-d'Or department, in the Bourgogne-Franche-Comté region, in eastern France.

Population

Wine
Some of the vineyards in Premeaux-Prissey are part of the appellation d'origine contrôlée (AOC) Nuits-Saint-Georges, which is named after the neighbouring commune, and some only qualify for the more general label Côte de Nuits-Villages.

See also
Communes of the Côte-d'Or department

References

Communes of Côte-d'Or